Canada's Top 100 Employers is an annual editorial competition that recognizes the best places in Canada to work. First held in 1999, the project aims to single out the employers that lead their industries in offering exceptional working conditions and progressive human resources policies. Winners are announced each October in The Globe and Mail newspaper. From 1999 to 2006, the list was published as an annual paperback book in Canada. Beginning in 2007, the list and the editors' Reasons for Selection were published online each year.  Beginning in 2014, the winners were also announced in a national magazine published in The Globe and Mail. The competition is organized by Mediacorp Canada Inc., a specialty publisher of employment-related periodicals.

Selection criteria
Employers are evaluated on eight criteria, which have remained consistent since the competition was launched: (1) Physical Workplace; (2) Work Atmosphere & Social; (3) Health, Financial & Family Benefits; (4) Vacation & Time Off; (5) Employee Communications; (6) Performance Management; (7) Training & Skills Development; and (8) Community Involvement.  Employers are compared to other organizations in their field to determine which offers the most progressive and forward-thinking programs. Selections are made by a team of editors, who publish detailed reasons for choosing each of the winners.  Any employer, whether private or public sector, operating in Canada may apply to be considered.  Applications are generally released each February and must be submitted to the editors approximately eight weeks later.

Regional and special-interest competitions
Employers complete a single application to be considered for the national competition, as well as 18 regional and special-interest competitions managed with a variety of newspaper and magazine partners across Canada:

References

External links
 

Employment websites in Canada
Employers